Allan Waters (August 11, 1921 – December 3, 2005) was a Canadian businessman and media icon.  Waters was one of the founders of CHUM Limited, a Canadian media corporation.

Waters worked in a drug company and quit in 1954 and with partner Jerry Grafstein purchased a then money-losing station, 1050 CHUM. From this small humble station, Waters built his media empire.

Getting ideas from a visit to Florida, Waters returned to Toronto and introduced the CHUM Chart, CHUM Chicks and CHUM bugs to attract teenage listeners.

Waters expanded from radio into the television market by buying Barrie CBC affiliate CKVR in 1969, four television stations in the Maritimes in 1972 which formed the CTV-affiliated Atlantic Television System (ATV), and then Toronto's fledgling CITY in 1978. Today CHUM consists of 33 radio stations, 12 television stations and 21 specialty channels, including MuchMusic, Bravo and Space.

Waters stepped down from the board of directors on October 29, 2005. Waters' sons James Waters and Ron Waters serve on CHUM Limited's board of directors. His son James (Jim) took over as head of CHUM from the elder Waters.

Waters died on December 3, 2005 at the age of 84.

References

External links
 Allan Waters
 Allan Waters Dies at 84; Founded Canadian Broadcaster CHUM
 CHUM Ltd. founder Allan Waters dies 
 Founder of CHUM Ltd. Allan Waters, broadcast pioneer, dies in Toronto at 84
 Allan Waters, 84: CHUM founder

1921 births
2005 deaths
Canadian radio company founders
Canadian television company founders
Canadian television executives
Ottawa Rough Riders owners
Businesspeople from Toronto